The Embassy of Ukraine in Sweden is a diplomatic mission of Ukraine in Lidingö, Stockholm, Sweden.

Andriy Plakhotnyuk has been the Ambassador since November 2020.

History of the Embassy of Ukraine in the Kingdom of Sweden 
In October 1918 the Government of the Ukrainian State "in order to establish permanent diplomatic relations between the Government of the Kingdom of Sweden and the Government of the Ukrainian State, as well as aiming to establish friendly connections and mutual understanding between our two great nations", sent a diplomatic Mission to the Scandinavian countries headed by Borys Bazhenov.

Borys Bazhenov settled down in the best hotel of Stockholm "The Grand Hotel", which still functions on Södra Blasieholmshamnen, 8. This address appears as the first location of the diplomatic Mission, accordingly. Later the Mission was located in the hotel "Regina" on Drottninggatan, 42-44.

In January 1919 the Directory decided to appoint Kostyantyn Losskyi (2) as the head of the Mission. Since his arrival in Stockholm in late February - early March the Mission relocated to Drottninggatan, 83 and the head of the Mission lived in apartment on Karlbergsvägen, 43b. Starting from 1 October 1919 to February 1920, this address was shared with the office of the Mission.

On 19 December 1991 the Kingdom of Sweden has recognized the independence of Ukraine and on 13 January 1992 an agreement between Ukraine and the Kingdom of Sweden on establishing diplomatic relations was concluded.

Diplomatic Mission of Ukraine in Stockholm headed by Kostyantyn Masyk the Ambassador Extraordinary and Plenipotentiary of Ukraine to the Republic of Finland and part-time to the Kingdom of Sweden (appointed by the Decree of the President of Ukraine № 501/92 16 October 1992) was launched on 31 May 1994 at Markvardsgatan, 5. Kostyantyn Masyk handed the Credentials to H.M. King Carl XVI Gustaf of Sweden on 11 March 1993.

By the Decree of the President of Ukraine № 715/97 on 28 July 1997 Ihor Podolev was appointed as the Ambassador Extraordinary and Plenipotentiary of Ukraine to Sweden. On 15 September 1997 Ihor Podolev handed the Credentials to H.M. King Carl XVI Gustaf of Sweden.

By the Decree of the President of Ukraine № 39/99 on 20 January 1999 Oleksandr Slipchenko was appointed as the Ambassador Extraordinary and Plenipotentiary of Ukraine to Sweden. On 11 February 1999 Oleksandr Slipchenko handed the Credentials to H.M. King Carl XVI Gustaf of Sweden.

On 1 October 1999 Embassy moved to another location on Stockholmsvägen, 18 on the suburbs of Stockholm (Lidingö) and on 1 April 2001 – to the current premises on Stjärnvägen, 2a.

By the Decree of the President of Ukraine № 1027/2002 on 14 November 2002 Leonid Kozhara was appointed as the Ambassador Extraordinary and Plenipotentiary of Ukraine to Sweden. On 23 April 2003 Leonid Kozhara handed the Credentials to H.M. King Carl XVI Gustaf of Sweden.

By the Decree of the President of Ukraine № 1038/2006 on 6 December 2006 Anatolii Ponomarenko was appointed as the Ambassador Extraordinary and Plenipotentiary of Ukraine to Sweden. On 22 February 2007 Anatolii Ponomarenko handed the Credentials to H.M. King Carl XVI Gustaf of Sweden. On 20 May 2008 he died prematurely.

By the Decree of the President of Ukraine № 1044/2011 on 11 November 2011 Valerii Stepanov was appointed as the Ambassador Extraordinary and Plenipotentiary of Ukraine to Sweden. On 8 March 2012 Valerii Stepanov handed the Credentials to H.M. King Carl XVI Gustaf of Sweden.

By the Decree of the President of Ukraine № 151/2015 on 19 March 2015 Ihor Sagach was appointed as the Ambassador Extraordinary and Plenipotentiary of Ukraine to Sweden. On 4 June 2015 Ihor Sagach handed the Credentials to H.M. King Carl XVI Gustaf of Sweden.

Diplomatic Staff of the Embassy of Ukraine in the Kingdom of Sweden  
Counsellor, Stanislav STASHEVSKYI
First secretary, Kateryna DEREPOVSKA
First secretary, Victoria TSURTSUMIA
First secretary, Pavlo MAZUR
Second secretary, Inna ZHOLTKEVYCH
Third secretary, Iryna VOLOVYK
Office of Defense Cooperation, Col. Serhii HARBARENKO

Political relations between Ukraine and the Kingdom of Sweden  
Recognition of Ukraine by the Kingdom of Sweden: 19 December 1991

Diplomatic relations

On 19 December 1991, Sweden was the first among the Nordic countries to recognize Ukraine's independence.

Diplomatic relations between Ukraine and Sweden were established on 13 January 1992.

History:

In 1918-1920 Ukraine had the Diplomatic Mission in Stockholm, headed by Borys Bazhenov and lately by Kostyantyn Losky.

After establishing the diplomatic relations between the two states, in September 1992 the Embassy of Sweden was opened in Ukraine.

On 31 May 1994, the Diplomatic Mission of Ukraine was opened in Stockholm and headed by non-resident Ambassador of Ukraine to the Republic of Finland.

On 11 February 1999, Olexander Slipchenko presented credentials to H.M. King Carl XVI Gustaf of Sweden as resident Ambassador of Ukraine in Stockholm.

Ambassadors of Ukraine to Sweden: Leonid Kozhara (2003-2004), Dr. Anatoliy Ponomarenko (2007-2008), Yevgen Perebyinis (2008-2011), Dr. Valerii Stepanov (2012-2014), Ihor Sagach (2015-2019).

Political dialogue:

Sweden is a reliable partner of Ukraine on the European integration path. Relations with Ukraine lie within foreign and security policy priorities of Sweden in Eastern Europe. Significant attention is paid to the implementation of Eastern Partnership initiated by Sweden and Poland. In the framework of the initiative Sweden put forward a large-scale project — Partnership for Energy Efficiency and Environment in Eastern Europe/Ukraine (E5P).

Sweden consistently supports efforts to protect sovereignty and territorial integrity of Ukraine as well as the non-recognition policy on the attempted illegal annexation of Crimea by Russia and the relevant EU sanctions against Russia.

The bilateral political dialogue is active at all levels:

Phone conversations of President of Ukraine Volodymyr Zelenskyy and Prime Minister of Sweden Stefan Löfven took place on 9 January and 12 June 2020.

On 4 December 2019 Prime Minister of Sweden Stefan Löfven paid a visit to Ukraine.

In September 2019 the President of Ukraine held the bilateral meetings with the Swedish Prime Minister within the framework of the 74th UN GA session and with the Speaker of Riksdag during the visit to Warsaw (Poland) for memorial events on the occasion of the 80th anniversary of the outbreak of World War II.

In 2020 Ministers for Foreign Affairs of Ukraine and Sweden Dmytro Kuleba and Ann Linde conducted a number of phone conversations and digital meetings (on 8 April, 10 June, 18 September and 13 November).

On 2-3 March 2020 Minister for Foreign Affairs of Sweden Ann Linde paid a visit to Ukraine.

Minister for Foreign Affairs of Ukraine (Vadym Prystaiko) paid a visit to Sweden on 4-6 November 2019.

On 9 July 2020 Ministers of Defense of Ukraine and Sweden Andriy Taran and Peter Hultqvist conducted a phone conversation.

Minister for International Development Cooperation of Sweden Peter Eriksson attended the Investment forum in Mariupol during his visit to Ukraine on 29-30 October 2019.

The headship and the members of parliament of Ukraine and Sweden maintain the bilateral inter-parliamentary interaction.

On 25 May 2020 Speakers of the Verkhovna Rada of Ukraine and Riksdag of Sweden Dmytro Razumkov and Andreas Norlen conducted a digital meeting.

Members of the Verkhovna Rada of Ukraine visited Stockholm with a working trip on 5-6 November 2019.

Deputy Chairman of the Foreign Affairs Committee of the Riksdag of Sweden Hans Wallmark paid a visit to Ukraine on 1-2 November 2019.

The Deputies’ group on inter-parliamentary relations with the Kingdom of Sweden has been established in the Verkhovna Rada of Ukraine.

In the Riksdag of Sweden there is also a group on inter-parliamentary friendship with Ukraine.

History of visits between Ukraine and Sweden at the highest state level:

In June 1978, King Carl XVI Gustaf of Sweden visited Kyiv as part of a state visit to the former USSR.
On 30 September – 3 October 2008 King Carl XVI Gustaf of Sweden and Queen Silvia of Sweden paid a State visit to Ukraine and made a trip to the village of Zmiivka (Kherson region), which is still inhabited by descendants of Swedes relocated there in the XVIII century.
In 2016 President of Ukraine (Petro Poroshenko) paid an official visit to Sweden.

The Embassy of Ukraine in Sweden on social media 

The Embassy on Twitter 

The Embassy on YouTube

References

External links 
Official website

Buildings and structures in Stockholm County
Lidingö Municipality
1994 establishments in Sweden
Sweden–Ukraine relations
Stockholm
Ukraine